Chiasmia separata is a moth in the family Geometridae first described by Herbert Druce in 1882. It is found on Saint Helena and has also been recorded from South Africa, Angola, Cameroon, Ivory Coast, Kenya, Madagascar, Mozambique, Nigeria, Rwanda, Tanzania and Uganda.

The forewings have a length of 13–17 mm, they are black, although the costal half is chrome yellow, extending to the anal angle. The hindwings are black. The underside is the same as the upperside. The head and front of the thorax are yellow and the back of the thorax and abdomen are black.

Subspecies
Chiasmia separata separata (Saint Helena, Africa)
Chiasmia separata conjugata (Herbulot, 1966) (Madagascar)

References

Macariini
Moths of Madagascar
Lepidoptera of Mozambique
Moths of Sub-Saharan Africa
Moths described in 1882